Meigle Junction railway station served the village of Meigle, Perth and Kinross, Scotland, from 1848 to 1861 on the Scottish Midland Junction Railway.

History 
The station opened on 2 August 1848 by the Scottish Midland Junction Railway. It opened with an interchange. The station closed in June 1861.

References

External links 

Disused railway stations in Perth and Kinross
Railway stations in Great Britain opened in 1848
Railway stations in Great Britain closed in 1861
1848 establishments in Scotland
1861 disestablishments in Scotland